Adventure World may refer to:

Adventure World (amusement park) in Perth, Australia
Former name of Six Flags America amusement park in Maryland, United States
American Adventure World, a former theme park in East Midlands, United Kingdom
Indiana Jones Adventure World, a video game
Adventure World (Japan), a mega theme park with a safari park, aquarium and amusement park